Kimen (The Seed) is a Norwegian film from 1974 directed by Erik Solbakken. It starred Kjell Stormoen, Svein Sturla Hungnes, Ragnhild Michelsen, Helle Ottesen, Helge Jordal, and Ragnhild Hilt. The film was based on the 1940 novel of the same name by Tarjei Vesaas.

Plot
Some people are living on a green island in the ocean to the west. In this simple and earthy environment, they live in harmony with each other. It seems to be a small community in balance. However, when a mentally unstable stranger comes to the island, this balance is suddenly destroyed. The stranger causes a young girl's death, and the death has a strong impact on the island community. Fear and mass hysteria affect the population.

The drama in the film highlights themes such as crowd psychology and an individual's responsibility for collective misdeeds.

Reception
When it was released, the film received good reviews from Gunvor Gjessing at Aftenposten and Bjørn Granum at Arbeiderbladet. Among other things, Gjessing wrote that "The film's most striking feature is that has a clear plot that is easy to grasp. It ought to appeal to many because here there is quite a lot to think about: outbreaks of hidden destructive forces, mass hysteria, herd behavior, and individual responsibility." Among other things, Granum  wrote that "We've got a promising new filmmaker in Norway. After several years of short films, Solbakken has come out in full bloom with his feature film debut."

Kimen received a "die throw" of three from Dagbladet in 2003.

Cast

References

External links 
 
 Nasjonalbiblioteket: Norsk filmografi: Kimen.

Norwegian drama films
1970s Norwegian-language films
1974 films
Films based on Norwegian novels
Films based on works by Tarjei Vesaas
1974 drama films